Creswick was an electoral district of the Legislative Assembly in the colony, and later Australian state of Victoria centred on the town of Creswick from 1859 to 1904.

It was defined in the 1858 Electoral Act, its area being bound by Greens Gully, Loddon River, Great Dividing Range, Coliban River, Middleton Creek and Limestone Creek.

Members for Creswick
Two members initially, three members from 1877, 
then one from 1889 in the electoral redistribution where 41 new seats were created.

Wheeler went on to represent Daylesford April 1889 to October 1900.
Anderson went on to represent Windermere May 1894 to May 1898.

References

Former electoral districts of Victoria (Australia)
1859 establishments in Australia
1904 disestablishments in Australia